Dubai Gold and Diamond Park is located in Dubai, UAE.
It was established in May 2001.
Spreading 511,343 Sq.feet (Phase 1), it is located on Sheikh Zayed Road, 23.5 km from Dubai International Airport, The park is an extension of the Jebel Ali Free Zone.

They manage a big building selling jewellery made with some of the world’s finest jewelry, gemstones, diamonds, precious stones and metals such as gold, silver, platinum which draws high-end personal accessories to residents and tourists.

Emaar Properties is the developer of Gold & Diamond Park.

See also
List of free-trade zones in Dubai

References
Official website

Geography of Dubai
History of Dubai
Transport in Dubai
Jewellery districts
Free-trade zones of the United Arab Emirates